Walter Leinweber (18 April 1907 in Füssen – 2 March 1997) was a German ice hockey player who competed in the 1932 Winter Olympics. In 1932 he was a member of the German ice hockey team, which won the bronze medal. He played all six matches as goalkeeper.

References

External links
 
profile

1907 births
1997 deaths
Ice hockey players at the 1932 Winter Olympics
Olympic bronze medalists for Germany
Olympic ice hockey players of Germany
Olympic medalists in ice hockey
Medalists at the 1932 Winter Olympics
Sportspeople from Füssen